The 2012 NCAA Women's Gymnastics Championship were held in the Gwinnett Center, at Duluth, Georgia on April 20–22, 2012. Twelve teams from the six regional meets advanced to the NCAA Division I national team and individual titles.

Regional Championships
Regional Championships were held on April 7, 2012 at the following six sites:
 Auburn Regional (at Auburn), 6 p.m. CT
 Finish: Georgia (1st), Oregon State (2nd), Michigan, Auburn, West Virginia, Michigan State
 Champaign Regional (at Illinois), 4 p.m. CT
 Finish: Oklahoma (1st), Stanford (2nd), Illinois, Denver, Kentucky, Illinois-Chicago
 Fayetteville Regional (at Arkansas), 4 p.m. CT 
 Finish: UCLA (1st), Arkansas (2nd), Boise St., Missouri, Maryland, New Hampshire
 Raleigh Regional (at North Carolina State), 4 p.m. ET
 Finish: Florida (1st), Ohio State (2nd), North Carolina State, Penn State, North Carolina, Kent State
 Salt Lake City Regional (at Utah), 6 p.m. MT
 Finish: Utah (1st), Nebraska (2nd), Minnesota, Arizona State, San Jose State, Iowa State
 Seattle Regional (at Washington), 4 p.m. PT
 Finish: Alabama (1st), LSU (2nd), Washington, Arizona, Iowa, Central Michigan

NCAA Women's Gymnastics Championship
NCAA Women's Gymnastics Championship:
NCAA Championships, April 20:
Top two teams from each regional.
 Afternoon session at Noon ET: 1st UCLA (197.400), 2nd Utah (197.200), 3rd Stanford (197.125), 4th Oklahoma (196.925), 5th Nebraska (196.625), 6th LSU (196.550)
 Evening session at 6 pm ET: 1st Alabama (197.675), 2nd Florida (197.650), 3rd Arkansas (197.150), 4th Ohio State (196.525), 5th Georgia, (196.500), 6th Oregon State (196.475)

Final six teams (top three teams from Friday's sessions).
 Super six teams:
 UCLA, Utah, Stanford, Alabama, Florida, Arkansas
 Individual Event Finals – Duluth, Georgia, Saturday, April 22 (1 p.m.):
 Vault – 1st Kytra Hunter, Florida (9.8750 ); 2nd Diandra Milliner, Alabama (9.8250); 3rd Kat Ding, Georgia (9.8125)
 Uneven Parallel Bars – 1st Kat Ding, Georgia (9.9875); 2nd Sami Shapiro, Stanford (9.9000); 3rd Olivia Courtney, UCLA (9.8875) 
 Balance Beam – 1st Geralen Stack-Eaton, Alabama (9.9375), 2nd Megan Ferguson, Oklahoma (9.9250); 3rd Katie Matusik, Arizona (9.8875)
 Floor Exercise – 1st Kat Ding (9.9500); 2nd Geralen Stack-Eaton, Alabama (9.9375); 2nd Elyse Hopfner-Hibbs, UCLA (9.9375)
 All Around – Kytra Hunter, Florida, 39.725

Champions

Team Results

Super Six

References

External links
 NCAA Gymnastics Championship Official site

NCAA Women's Gymnastics championship
2012 in American sports
NCAA Women's Gymnastics Championship